Abe Lincoln in Illinois may refer to:
 Abe Lincoln in Illinois (play), a 1938 play by Robert E. Sherwood
 Abe Lincoln in Illinois (film), a 1940 biographical historical drama film
 Abe Lincoln in Illinois (Hallmark Hall of Fame), an American television play
 Abraham Lincoln's political career in Illinois